Beef chow fun, also known as gōn cháau ngàuh hó or gānchǎo níuhé in Chinese (乾炒牛河) meaning "dry fried beef Shahe noodles", is a staple Cantonese dish, made from stir-frying beef,  hor fun (wide rice noodles) and  bean sprouts. It is commonly found in yum cha restaurants in Guangdong, Hong Kong, and overseas, as well as in  cha chaan tengs. Chow fun, or stir-fried hor fun (shahe fen) noodles, is any number of different individual preparations (and could be compared to the number of pizza varieties in United States cuisine). In the Philippines, it is called "beef hofan" (河粉).

The main ingredient of this dish is hor fun noodles, which is also known as shahe fen, originating in the town of Shahe in  Guangzhou. It is a wide, flat noodle that is cut into shape (qiefen). The most common methods of cooking hor fun are in soup or stir fried. Hor fun can be dry-fried (fried only with condiments such as soy sauce) or wet-fried (fried with a thickening sauce). Today, the dry-fried variant is much more common, to the extent that the method is usually not specified—"hor fun" on a restaurant menu would refer to dry-fried hor fun. Furthermore, wet-fried hor fun usually consist of seafood, while dry-fried hor fun usually consists of beef or chicken.

Sliced beef is marinated first. Then, the beef is seared in a wok, this is important to obtain the signature taste of beef chow fun (wok hei). Other ingredients and the hor fun noodles are added, then combined with the beef and sauce. The bean sprouts are then stir-fried with the rest of the chow fun until they are tender and the dish is ready to serve.

An important factor in the making of this dish is wok hei. The cooking must be done over a high flame and the stirring must be done quickly. Not only must the hor fun be stirred quickly, it must not be handled too strongly or it will break into pieces. The amount of oil also needs to be controlled very well; if not, the excess oil or dry texture will ruin the dish. Because of these factors, this dish is a major test for chefs in Cantonese cooking.This wok hei provides an almost charred flavor which is hard to obtain without high heat.

History
The origin of chow fun is unknown, but there is a legend concerning the origin of dry-fried chow fun:

See also

 Kwetiau sapi
 Kwetiau goreng
 Char kway teow
 Chinese noodles
 List of noodle dishes
 Shahe fen

References

Beef dishes
Cantonese cuisine
Chinese noodle dishes
Fried noodles
Hong Kong noodle dishes
Soy-based foods